Little Richard Meets Masayoshi Takanaka is a rock and roll album recorded by American rock pioneer Little Richard and Japanese jazz fusion guitarist Masayoshi Takanaka. Released on the Eastworld label in 1992, it was Little Richard's final studio album before his death in 2020. The record features re-recordings of some of Little Richard's biggest hits.

Track listing
"Good Golly Miss Molly" – 3:42
"Tutti Frutti" – 3:39
"Miss Ann" – 4:43
"Lucille" – 3:49
"Long Tall Sally" – 3:30
"Send Me Some Lovin'" – 3:32
"Jenny, Jenny" – 3:09
"Rip It Up" – 3:10
"Kansas City / Hey Hey Hey Hey" – 3:52
"Ready Teddy" – 3:52

References

External links

1992 albums
Little Richard albums
Collaborative albums